Thomas Nelson Winter (born in 1944) was an American associate professor of Greek in Classics and Religious Studies at University of Nebraska at Lincoln and former president of the Unitarian Church of Lincoln.

Education 
From 1968, Winter holds his PhD in Classics at Northwestern University, Chicago, with the thesis Apology as prosecution: the trial of Apuleius.

Some works

Thesis

Books

Articles

References 

1944 births
University of Nebraska faculty

Living people